Einar is a Scandinavian given name deriving from the Old Norse name Einarr, which according to Guðbrandur Vigfússon is directly connected with the concept of the einherjar, warriors who died in battle and ascended to Valhalla in Norse mythology. Vigfússon comments that 'the name Einarr is properly = einheri" and points to a relation to the term with the Old Norse common nouns einarðr (meaning "bold") and einörð (meaning "valour").

Einar as given name
Einár (rapper) (2002–2021), Swedish rapper
Einar Jan Aas (born 1955), Norwegian footballer
Einar Arnórsson (1880–1955), Icelandic politician
Einar Axelsson (1895–1971), Swedish actor 
Einar Benediktsson (1864–1940), Icelandic poet and lawyer
Einar Blidberg (1906–1993), Swedish Navy vice admiral
Einar Bollason (born 1943), Icelandic former basketball player, coach and TV analyst
Einar Bragi (1921–2005), Icelandic poet
Einar Bruno Larsen (1939–2021), Norwegian footballer and ice hockey player
Einar Dahl (politician) (born 1880), Norwegian politician
Einar Daníelsson (born 1970), Icelandic footballer
Einar Dønnum (1897–1947) Norwegian Nazi collaborator
Einar Englund (1916–1999), Finnish composer
Einar Eriksson (1921–2009), Swedish weightlifter
Einar E. Erlandsen (1908–1995), American politician
Einar Fagstad (1899–1961), Norwegian-Swedish accordionist, singer, actor and composer
Einar Førde (1943–2004), Norwegian politician, Minister of Education and Church Affairs and vice-chairman of the Norwegian Labour Party
Einar Forseth (1892–1988), Swedish artist
Einar Galilea (born 1994), Spanish footballer
Einar Gerhardsen (1897–1987), Norwegian politician, Prime Minister of Norway
Einar Granath (1936–1993), Swedish ice hockey player
Einar Már Guðmundsson (born 1954), Icelandic author
Einar Hákonarson (born 1945), Icelandic artist
Einar Hanson (1899–1927), Swedish actor
Einar Haugen (1906–1994), American linguist, author and Professor at University of Wisconsin–Madison and Harvard University
Einar Hille (1894–1980), American scholar
Einar Hjörleifsson Kvaran (1859–1938), Icelandic editor, novelist, poet, playwright and prominent spiritualist
Einar Høgetveit (born 1949), Norwegian prosecutor
Einar Høigård (1907 – 1943), Norwegian educator and activist
Einar H. Ingman Jr. (1929–2015) American soldier
Einar Iversen (1930–2019), Norwegian jazz pianist
Einar Jansen (1893–1960), Norwegian historian, genealogist and archivist
Einar Jolin (1890 – 1976), Swedish painter
Einar Jónsson (1874–1954), Icelandic sculptor
Einar Jørgensen (1875 – 1944), Norwegian military officer, teacher and politician
Einar Kárason (born 1955), Icelandic writer
Einar Riegelhuth Koren (born 1984), Norwegian handball player
Einar Kristjánsson (1934 – 1996), Icelandic alpine skier
Einar Axel Malmstrom (1907–1954), American military officer
Einar Møbius (1891–1981), Danish gymnast
Einar Nerman (1888–1983), Swedish artist
Einar Økland (born 1940) Norwegian writer
Einar Ólafsson (disambiguation)
Einar Olsen (disambiguation)
Einar Olsson (born 1981), Norwegian musician
Einar Örn Benediktsson (born 1962), Icelandic vocalist for Sugarcubes and Ghostigital and former Reykjavik City Council member
Einar Ortiz (born 1993), Italian singer
Einar Nilsen (1901–1980), Norwegian boxer
Einar Pettersen, Norwegian wrestler
Einar Johan Rasmussen (born 1937), Norwegian engineer and ship owner
Einar Rose (1898–1979) Norwegian entertainer
Einar Sagstuen (born 1951), Norwegian cross country skier 
Einar Schleef (1944–2001), German dramatist, painter, set director, writer, and actor
Einar Sigurdsson (died 1020), Norse royal
Einar Skavlan (1882–1954), Norwegian journalist
Einar Sörensen (1875–1941), Swedish fencer
Einar Stavang (1898–1992) Norwegian politician 
Einar Stray (born 1990), Norwegian musician and composer (Einar Stray Orchestra)
Einar Strøm (disambiguation)
Einar Selvik (born 1979), Norwegian musician (Wardruna, Gorgoroth) 
Einar Solberg, Norwegian keyboardist and composer (Emperor and Leprous)
Einar Söderqvist (1921–1996), Swedish athlete
Einar Sommerfeldt (1889–1976), Norwegian rower
Einar Soone (born 1947), Estonian clergyman
Einar Aaron Swan (1903–1940), American musician
Einar Thambarskelfir (c. 980–c. 1050) Norwegian noble and politician
Einar Thorsteinn (1942–2015), Icelandic architect
Einar Tørnquist (born 1982), Norwegian entertainer
Einar Vallbaum (born 1959), Estonian economist and politician
Einar Vilhjálmsson (born 1960), Icelandic javelin thrower
Einar Westerberg (1893–1976), Swedish flight surgeon

Einar as middle name 
Ole Einar Bjørndalen (born 1974), Norwegian professional biathlete
Carl-Einar Häckner, (born 1969), Swedish illusionist, actor and comedian
Kenneth Einar Himma, American philosopher, author, lawyer, academic and lecturer
Bjørn Einar Romøren (born 1981), Norwegian ski jumper
Jan Einar Thorsen (born 1966), Norwegian Alpine skier

Last name
Kristján Einar (born 1989), Icelandic racing driver

Einar in popular culture 
Einar is the name of a war general in the fantasy game HeroScape. and is also a race of dwarves in the Dragonlance fiction.
Einar is the first name of the Autumn King, Einar Danaan, in the fantasy series, “Crescent City,” written by Sarah J Mass
Einar is a character in Vinland Saga.
Einar is a character in the Lorien Legacies Return book Generation One.
In some of Ray Bradbury's short stories, there is mention of a mysterious "Uncle Einar".
Einar is a character in the film “An Unfinished Life”(2005) starring Robert Redford
Einar Stray Orchestra
Einar Gerhardsens plass

References

External links
Vigfusson, Gudbrand (1874). An Icelandic-English Dictionary: Based on the MS. Collections of the Late Richard Cleasby. Oxford at the Clarendon Press.
Behind the Name: Einar

See also
 Einer (disambiguation)
 Ejner
 Ejnar
 Enar

Masculine given names
Norse mythology
Scandinavian masculine given names
Norwegian masculine given names
Icelandic masculine given names
Swedish masculine given names
Finnish masculine given names
Estonian masculine given names